Montescudo-Monte Colombo is a comune (municipality) in the Province of Rimini in the Italian region Emilia-Romagna.

It was established on 1 January 2016 by the merger of the municipalities of Montescudo and Monte Colombo.

References

Cities and towns in Emilia-Romagna